Vlado Dimovski, Slovenian economist, philosopher, politician, consultant and university professor, * 21 July 1960, Postojna, Slovenia.

Biography 
After finishing the Bežigrad Grammar School Dimovski graduated in 1984 at the School of Economics and Business at the University of Ljubljana, where he received also an M.S. in economics in 1988. At the Faculty of Arts, University of Ljubljana he graduated in 1989 also in philosophy. He received his PhD degree in management and finance from the Cleveland State University, Ohio, United States in 1994.

Since 1985 Dimovski has been teaching at the School of Economics and Business, Ljubljana, from 2005 onwards as a full professor. As a visiting professor, Dimovski has been teaching at many different universities all over the world. Dimovski directed many research projects, financed by research foundations and corporations.

Dimovski counseled many different administrative and corporative bodies. Dimovski was two times Minister of Labour, Family and Social Affairs in the Government of Slovenia: in the government of prime minister Janez Drnovšek (2000–2002), and in the government of prime minister Tone Rop (2002–2004).

Since 2018 Dimovski is a personal counselor of the prime minister of the Republic of North Macedonia. Since 2019 he is the vice president of the Adriatic Council.

In 2016 Dimovski became a regular member of the European Academy of Sciences and Arts in Salzburg.

Selected bibliography 

Škerlavaj, M., Štemberger, M. I., & Dimovski, V. (2007). Organizational learning culture—the missing link between business process change and organizational performance. International journal of production economics, 106(2), 346–367. academia.edu
Pahor, M., Škerlavaj, M., & Dimovski, V. (2008). Evidence for the network perspective on organizational learning. Journal of the American Society for Information Science and Technology, 59(12), 1985–1994. www.researchgate.net
Zagoršek, H., Dimovski, V., & Škerlavaj, M. (2009). Transactional and transformational leadership impacts on organizational learning. Journal for East European Management Studies, 144–165. www.econstor.eu
Cadez, S., Dimovski, V., & Zaman Groff, M. (2017). Research, teaching and performance evaluation in academia: the salience of quality. Studies in Higher Education, 42(8), 1455–1473. srhe.tandfonline.com

References

External links 
 Vlado Dimovski in the COBISS system
 Repository of the University of Ljubljana
 Digital library of Slovenia
 Researchgate.net

See also 
 List of Slovenian politicians
 List of Cleveland State University people
 List of University of Ljubljana people

1960 births
Living people
20th-century Slovenian economists
Politicians from Ljubljana
University of Ljubljana alumni
Academic staff of the University of Ljubljana
Members of the European Academy of Sciences and Arts
21st-century Slovenian economists